60th meridian may refer to:

60th meridian east, a line of longitude east of the Greenwich Meridian
60th meridian west, a line of longitude west of the Greenwich Meridian